50 Ways of Saying Fabulous is a 2005 New Zealand drama film directed by gay director Stewart Main and starring Jay Collins and Andrew Patterson. It is based on a novel by Graeme Aitken. The film premiered at the 2005 Toronto International Film Festival. It received negative reviews and had little success at the New Zealand box office. In spite of this, the film did however win the Special Jury Award at Italy's Turin International Gay and Lesbian Film Festival in 2005.

Premise

The film deals with a young farmer's son named Billy, who does not appreciate his terrestrial life, and instead wishes to explore outer space. As the story develops, Billy struggles with his homosexuality and his changing relationships with those around him.

Cast

References

External links
 
 
 Review from the New York Times
 NZ On Screen page

2005 films
2005 drama films
2000s English-language films
Films based on New Zealand novels
New Zealand LGBT-related films
Films set in New Zealand
LGBT-related drama films
2005 LGBT-related films
Gay-related films
New Zealand drama films